Hibbertia depilipes is a species of flowering plant in the family Dilleniaceae and is endemic to the far south-west of Western Australia. It is usually a sprawling shrub with scattered linear leaves and yellow flowers arranged singly in leaf axils usually with ten stamens all on one side of the two carpels.

Description
The carpels are densely hairy and there are two ovules per carpel. Flowering has been recorded from mid-October to mid-December.

Taxonomy
Hibbertia depilipes was first formally described in 2017 by Kevin Thiele in the journal Nuytsia from specimens he collected in Orchard Valley in 2013. The specific epithet (depilipes) means "hairless foot" referring to the glabrous petioles.

Distribution and habitat
This species grows in open woodland and forest, usually in moist situations and occurs mostly west of the Albany Highway but inland from the coast in the Avon Wheatbelt, Jarrah Forest and Mallee biogeographic regions in the far south-west of Western Australia.

Conservation status
Hibbertia depilipes is classified as "not threatened" by the Government of Western Australia Department of Parks and Wildlife.

See also
List of Hibbertia species

References

depilipes
Flora of Western Australia
Plants described in 2017
Taxa named by Kevin Thiele